Arkaulovo (Arqawıl) is a rural locality (a selo) and the administrative centre of Arkaulovsky Selsoviet, Salavatsky District, Bashkortostan, Russia. The population was 1,439 as of 2010. There are 17 streets.

Geography 
Arkaulovo is located 34 km northwest of Maloyaz (the district's administrative centre) by road. Beshevlyarovo is the nearest rural locality.

References 

Rural localities in Salavatsky District